Milewo-Gawary  is a village in the administrative district of Gmina Krasne, within Przasnysz County, Masovian Voivodeship, in east-central Poland.

The village has a population of 8.

References

Milewo-Gawary